New Durham was an unincorporated community and now a neighborhood located within Edison in Middlesex County, New Jersey, United States, south of Dismal Swamp.

Along with Piscatawaytown, Bonhamtown, New Dover and Stelton, New Durham is one of the older historical crossroad communities established in Edison (either as once part of Piscataway or Woodbridge before the establishment of Raritan Township, as Edison was earlier known). It was describe in 1834 as having a tavern, a store, and a half-dozen dwellings.

See also
Edison, New Jersey natural gas explosion
List of neighborhoods in Edison, New Jersey

References

Neighborhoods in Edison, New Jersey
Unincorporated communities in Middlesex County, New Jersey
Unincorporated communities in New Jersey